Victor Ochi (born October 2, 1993) is a former American football linebacker. He played college football at Stony Brook. He was originally signed as an undrafted free agent by the Baltimore Ravens after the 2016 NFL Draft.

Early life
Ochi was born in The Bronx on October 2, 1993 to Emmanuel and Queen Ochi, immigrants from Nigeria. At an early age, he became a fan of the New York Giants, studying great pass rushers like Michael Strahan and Osi Umenyiora. His parents wanted him to focus on his studies, and did not let him play football until his sophomore year of high school, when he finally convinced them to allow him to try out for the school team.

He also lived with an aunt in Nigeria from the ages of 9 to 12.

High school career
Ochi attended Valley Stream Central High School, where he played football and ran track. As a junior, he recorded 57 tackles and 8.5 sacks. As a senior, he recorded 72 tackles and 11 sacks. He was an All-New York State, All-Nassau County and All-Long Island selection. He ranked forth in MSG Varsity's top 100 players on Long Island. He also played for Long Island in the Outback Steakhouse Empire Challenge.

College career
After high school, Ochi attended Stony Brook University. In 2011, he redshirted his true freshman season. As a redshirt freshman in 2012, he appeared in all 13 games, starting five. He recorded 45 tackles, 7.5 tackles-for-loss and three sacks. In 2013, as a redshirt sophomore he appeared in 11 games, with nine starts. He recorded 33 tackles, 10 tackles-for-loss, 5.5 sacks and one forced fumble. As a redshirt junior in 2014, he started all 11 games. He recorded 57 tackles, 16.5 tackles-for-loss, 11 sacks and two forced fumbles. In 2015, as a redshirt senior, he recorded 47 tackles, 16.5 tackles-for-loss and 13 sacks. He then played in the East-West Shrine Game. His totals made him Stony Brook's All-time sacks leader.

Career statistics

Professional career

Baltimore Ravens
After going undrafted in the 2016 NFL Draft, Ochi was signed by the Baltimore Ravens on May 6, 2016. He was released on September 3 during final cuts.

New York Jets
On September 5, 2016, Ochi was signed to the New York Jets' practice squad. On October 22, he was promoted to the Jets active roster. He was released by the Jets on November 5, 2016 and was re-signed to the practice squad on November 12.

Kansas City Chiefs
On January 4, 2017, Ochi was signed by Kansas City Chiefs off the Jets' practice squad. He was waived by the Chiefs on May 22, 2017.

Tennessee Titans
On June 13, 2017, Ochi signed with the Tennessee Titans. He was waived/injured by the Titans on August 6, 2017 after suffering a torn ACL and was placed on injured reserve.

On April 9, 2018, Ochi was waived by the Titans.

New York Guardians
In October 2019, Ochi was drafted by the XFL to play for the New York Guardians. He was waived during final roster cuts on January 22, 2020.

Los Angeles Wildcats
Ochi signed to the XFL's Team 9 practice squad after being released by the Guardians. He was signed off of Team 9 by the Los Angeles Wildcats on March 2, 2020. He had his contract terminated when the league suspended operations on April 10, 2020.

References

External links
 Stony Brook Seawolves bio
 New York Jets bio

Living people
1993 births
Sportspeople from the Bronx
Players of American football from New York City
American football linebackers
Stony Brook Seawolves football players
Baltimore Ravens players
New York Guardians players
New York Jets players
Kansas City Chiefs players
Tennessee Titans players
American sportspeople of Nigerian descent
Team 9 players
Los Angeles Wildcats (XFL) players